Shirley is an unincorporated community in Tyler County, West Virginia, United States. Shirley has a post office with ZIP code 26434.

References

Unincorporated communities in Tyler County, West Virginia
Unincorporated communities in West Virginia